This is a list of settlements in Arcadia, Greece.

 Aetorrachi
 Agia Sofia
 Agia Varvara
 Agiorgitika
 Agios Andreas
 Agios Georgios
 Agios Ioannis
 Agios Konstantinos
 Agios Petros
 Agios Vasileios, Leonidio
 Agios Vasileios, Tripoli
 Agriakona
 Agridi
 Akovos
 Alea
 Alepochori
 Alonistaina
 Ampelaki
 Anavryto
 Anemodouri
 Ano Doliana
 Ano Karyes
 Anthochori
 Arachamites
 Arachova
 Artemisio
 Asea
 Astros
 Athinaio
 Atsicholos
 Charadros
 Chirades
 Chora
 Choremis
 Chotoussa
 Chranoi
 Chrysochori
 Chrysovitsi
 Dafni
 Dara
 Dimitra
 Dimitsana
 Dorizas
 Doxa
 Drakovouni
 Dyrrachio
 Elaiochori
 Elati
 Elatos
 Elliniko
 Ellinitsa
 Episkopi
 Evandro
 Falaisia
 Garea
 Gefyra
 Giannaioi
 Graikos
 Isaris
 Isoma Karyon
 Kakouraiika
 Kalliani
 Kaltezes
 Kamara
 Kamari
 Kamenitsa
 Kandalos
 Kandila
 Kapsas
 Tou Karatoula
 Karatoulas
 Kardaras
 Kardaritsi
 Karytaina
 Kastanitsa
 Kastanochori
 Kastraki
 Kastri
 Kato Doliana
 Kato Karyes
 Katsimpalis
 Kerasia
 Kerasitsa
 Kerastaris
 Kerpini
 Kokkinorrachi
 Kokkoras
 Kollines
 Komi
 Kontovazaina
 Korakovouni
 Kosmas
 Kotili
 Kounoupia
 Kourounios
 Koutroufa
 Kyparissia
 Langadia
 Lasta
 Lefkochori
 Leonidio
 Leontari
 Leptini
 Levidi
 Limni
 Liodora
 Lithovounia
 Livadaki
 Loukas
 Loutra Iraias
 Lykaio
 Lykochia
 Lykosoura
 Lykouresis
 Lyssarea
 Magoula
 Magouliana
 Mainalo
 Makri
 Makrysi
 Mallota
 Manaris
 Manthyrea
 Marathoussa
 Mari
 Mavria
 Mavriki
 Mavrogiannis
 Megalopoli
 Meligou
 Melissopetra
 Merkovouni
 Mesorrachi
 Monastiraki
 Mygdalia
 Nea Chora
 Nea Ekklisoula
 Neochori Falaisias
 Neochori Lykosouras
 Neochori, Korythio
 Neochori, Tropaia
 Nestani
 Nymfasia
 Ochthia
 Orchomenos
 Oria
 Palaiochori
 Palaiochouni
 Palaiopyrgos
 Palamari
 Pallantio
 Paloumpa
 Panagia
 Panagitsa
 Paparis
 Paradeisia
 Paralio Astros
 Paralongoi
 Partheni
 Pavlia
 Pelagos
 Peleta
 Pera Melana
 Perdikoneri
 Perdikovrysi
 Perivolia
 Perthori
 Petrina
 Piana
 Pigadakia
 Pigadi
 Pikernis
 Plaka
 Platana
 Platanaki
 Platanos
 Potamia
 Poulithra
 Pournaria
 Pragmateftis
 Prasino
 Prastos
 Psari
 Psili Vrysi
 Pyrgaki
 Pyrris
 Raches
 Rados
 Raftis
 Rapsommati
 Rizes
 Rizospilia
 Roeino
 Routsi
 Sanga
 Sapounakaiika
 Sarakini
 Sarakini, Iraia
 Servos
 Silimna
 Simiades
 Sitaina
 Skopi
 Skortsinos
 Soulari
 Souli
 Soulos
 Spatharis
 Stadio
 Stavrodromio
 Stemnitsa
 Steno
 Stolos
 Stringos
 Syrna
 Thanas
 Theoktisto
 Thoknia
 Tourkolekas
 Trilofo
 Tripoli
 Tripotamia
 Tripotamo
 Tropaia
 Tselepakos
 Tsitalia
 Tyros 
 Tzivas
 Vachlia
 Valtesiniko
 Valtetsi
 Vangos
 Vastas 
 Veligosti
 Velimachi
 Vervena
 Vidiaki
 Vlacherna
 Vlachokerasia
 Vlachorraptis
 Vlisidia
 Vouno
 Vourvoura
 Voutsaras
 Voutsis
 Vytina
 Vyziki
 Xirokarotaina
 Xiropigado
 Zatouna
 Zevgolateio
 Zoni 
 Zygovisti

By municipality

See also
List of towns and villages in Greece

Arcadia